"Trying to Hold on to My Woman" is a song written by McKinley Jackson and James Reddick and performed by Lamont Dozier. It reached No. 4 on the U.S. R&B chart and No. 15 on the U.S. pop chart in 1974. It was featured on his 1973 album Out Here on My Own.

The song was arranged by Gene Page and produced by McKinley Jackson.

The song ranked No. 87 on Billboard magazine's Top 100 singles of 1974.

Charts

Other charting versions
Garland Green released version of the song entitled "Tryin' to Hold On" as a single in 1983 which reached No. 63 on the U.S. R&B chart.

References

1973 songs
1973 singles
1983 singles
ABC Records singles